"Thunder" is a song by American pop rock band Imagine Dragons. It was released by Interscope Records and Kidinakorner on April 27, 2017, as the second single from their third studio album, Evolve (2017). Written by band members Dan Reynolds, Wayne Sermon, Ben McKee, Daniel Platzman, and its producers Alex Da Kid and Jayson DeZuzio, "Thunder" peaked at number four on the US Billboard Hot 100.  The song became the band's fourth single in that country to reach the top ten after "Radioactive", "Demons" and  "Believer". It also reached the top 10 in Australia, Austria, Belgium, Canada, Germany, Italy, New Zealand, Poland, Slovakia, Slovenia, Sweden. The song was nominated for a Grammy Award for Best Pop Duo/Group Performance.

Music video
The official music video for the song was released on Imagine Dragons' YouTube channel on May 2, 2017. The video was shot in Dubai, filmed in black and white. It features the band's lead vocalist, Dan Reynolds, singing and dancing among extraterrestrials, portrayed by dancers Haroon Al Abdali, Mamadou Bathily, and Gianna Gi, around Downtown Dubai and the Burj Khalifa. It was directed by Joseph Kahn.

As of November 2021, the video has 1.7 billion views on YouTube, making it the group's second most viewed video. It also has over 10 million likes.

Live performances
Imagine Dragons performed the song at the 2017 American Music Awards, in a medley with singer Khalid's "Young Dumb & Broke", with Khalid joining them for the performance. A little over a month later, on December 20, a studio version of the mash-up was released.

Chart performance
"Thunder" peaked at number four on the US Billboard Hot 100. The single has also reached number one in Belarus, the Czech Republic and the top ten in Australia, Austria, Belgium, Canada, Germany, Hungary, Italy, Netherlands, New Zealand, Paraguay, Poland, Russia, Slovakia, Sweden, and Switzerland. It topped the Billboard Hot Rock Songs chart for 21 weeks, Alternative Songs (three weeks), Adult Top 40 (seven weeks), and the Mainstream Top 40 (for one week) charts.

It became the ninth best-selling song of 2017 in the United States, with 1,189,000 copies sold in the year.

Critical reception
Critics from Billboard magazine placed it number 84 on its list of best songs of 2017, stating "'Thunder' is relatively stripped down, and between its soldierly cadence and a bouncy, helium-inflated, one-word hook, it makes for a curious pop gem". In a review of the band's live performance at London's O2 Arena, The Guardian wrote of the song: "...the irresistible, hiccupping electro-pop of Thunder, a tune that could sit equally happily in a set by Pink or Rihanna".

Track listing

Charts

Weekly charts

Medley version

Year-end charts

Medley version

Decade-end charts

Certifications

Release history

See also 
 List of best-selling singles in Australia

References

2017 singles
2017 songs
Imagine Dragons songs
Music videos directed by Joseph Kahn
Songs written by Ben McKee
Songs written by Daniel Platzman
Songs written by Dan Reynolds (musician)
Songs written by Wayne Sermon
Songs written by Alex da Kid
Song recordings produced by Alex da Kid
Kidinakorner singles
Interscope Records singles
American synth-pop songs
Black-and-white music videos
Songs about weather
Electropop songs